Hojjatabad (also Romanized as Ḩojjatābād; also known as Dehnow) is a village in Nakhlestan Rural District, in the Central District of Kahnuj County, Kerman Province, Iran. At the 2006 census, its population was 720, in 147 families.

References 

Populated places in Kahnuj County